The Avenue de Suffren is an avenue situated between the 7th and 15th arrondissements of Paris.

Location and access 
The Avenue de Suffren has one of its extremities at quai Branly and the others at boulevard Garibaldi near place de la République-de-Panama. It is named for 18th century admiral Suffren.

It intersects the avenues La Motte-Picquet, Lowendal, Ségur and Rue Pérignon.

Rue de Buenos-Aires, Avenue Octave-Gréard, Rue Jean-Rey, Rue du Général-Lambert, Rue Desaix, Avenue Joseph-Bouvard, Rue Jean-Pierre-Bloch, Rue Champfleury, Rue de Presles, Avenue du Général-Détrie, Rue de la Fédération, Rue Jean-Carriès, Rue Dupleix, Avenue de Champaubert, Rue du Laos, Rue de l'Abbé-Roger-Derry, Rue Mario-Nikis, Rue Chasseloup-Laubat, Rue Valentin-Haüy, Rue Bellart, Rue Rosa-Bonheur, and Rue Barthélemy have an extremity at Avenue de Suffren.

Metro station Ségur on Paris Métro Line 10 is at the intersection of Avenue de Suffren and Rue Pérignon.

History 
The avenue was opened between what is now quai Branly and avenue de Lowendal when the Champ-de-Mars was built, around 1770. In 1838, the Minister of Finances transferred authority on the avenue to the City of Paris.

In 1867, it was decided to prolongate the Avenue up to Rue Barthélémy and Boulevard de Grenelle (now Boulevard Garibaldi). The Abattoirs de Grenelle slaughterhouse had to be destroyed to allow the project to proceed.

Significant spots 

 No 74 : location of the Grande Roue de Paris, built for the Exposition universelle of 1900 and dismantled in 1937.
 No 78 : Village suisse.
 Nos 92–94 : building designed in 1929 by architects Jean Boucher and Paul Delaplanche, ornated with sculptures by F.-P. Joyeux.
 No 106 : formerly a brothel. During the Occupation, it was popular among officers of the Wehrmacht, and thus became target of a bombing by a group of Resistants under Pierre Georges (later known as Colonel Fabien), along with Georges Tondelier, Gaultier and another member of the Bataillons de la jeunesse known only as "Paul". The spot is now a modern building.
 No 120 : Henri Michaux lived there between 1968 and his death in 1984.
 No 125 : entrance of the conference centre of the World Heritage Centre where general conferences of UNESCO are held.
 No 145 : Embassy of Panama in France.
 No 158 bis : birthplace of Robert Wogensky (painter, 1919–).
 At the angle with Avenue de Ségur, the Caisse autonome nationale de sécurité des mineurs. The building was designed in 1922 by architects Davidson and René Patouillard-Demoriane.

Notes, sources and references

Bibliography 

 .

See also 

 7e arrondissement de Paris
 15e arrondissement de Paris

Streets in Paris
7th arrondissement of Paris
15th arrondissement of Paris